Sarkarhat N. R. High School is a secondary school in Nizampur, Mirsharai Upazila, Chittagong District, Bangladesh. Its full name is Sarkarhat Najar Ali Rupjan High School.

References

High schools in Bangladesh
Educational institutions established in 1939
1939 establishments in India
Schools in Chittagong District